FanFan's World (Pinyin:FànFàn de shì jiè) is FanFan's first album released in November 2000.

Track listing
 我的初世紀 (My First World)
 因為 (Because)
 想太多 (Thinking Too Much)
 每天 (Everyday)
 如果我有一支天使棒 (If I Had an Angel's Wand)
 潔癖 (Mysophobia)
 You Have a Black Heart
 到不了 (Can't Arrive)
 我們是朋友 (We're Friends)
 不要哭 (Don't Cry)
 拜拜 (Bye Bye)

2000 albums
Christine Fan albums